Obadan is a small town located in Nigeria, about   east of Benin City, Edo State, Nigeria.

The town dates from before the second period of the Benin Empire in about AD 1200 and is a village with hereditary chiefs (or enigie). The traditional language of the town is Edo, and Obadan arts and culture reflect typical Benin traits.

History
Obadan came to prominence during the reign of King Akenzua I around 1713 AD. During one of the wars fought to extend the Oba's rule to the far north of Benin City, Ezomo was made the chief commander of a brigade which camped out under shade trees called "Obadan." The enogie of Obadan was made platoon commander. Thus the name Obadan comes from that shade tree where the warlords' camp was based, the base eventually becoming Obadan village and the present site of Obadan Village today.

References

External links
 Obadan people

Populated places in Edo State